Queen Louise is a German silent historical film directed by Karl Grune and starring Mady Christians, Mathias Wieman, and Anita Dorris. It was released in two separate parts slightly less than a month from each other in December 1927 and January 1928. It commenced a series of historical epics directed by Grune. It was shot partly at the Terra Studios in Berlin. The film's sets were designed by the art director Hans Jacoby.

The film portrays the short life of Louise of Mecklenburg-Strelitz, wife of the Prussian monarch Frederick William III.

Cast

References

Bibliography

External links

1927 films
1928 films
1920s historical drama films
Films of the Weimar Republic
German historical drama films
German silent feature films
Films directed by Karl Grune
Films set in Berlin
Films set in the 1790s
Films set in the 1800s
Biographical films about German royalty
Prussian films
Terra Film films
Louise of Mecklenburg-Strelitz
Depictions of Napoleon on film
Cultural depictions of Gebhard Leberecht von Blücher
German black-and-white films
1927 drama films
1928 drama films
Films set in the Kingdom of Prussia
Silent historical drama films
1920s German films
Films shot at Terra Studios
1920s German-language films